Brood XIV (also known as Brood 14) is one of 15 separate broods of periodical cicadas that appear regularly throughout the midwestern and northeastern United States. Every 17 years, the cicadas of Brood XIV tunnel en masse to the surface of the ground, mate, lay eggs, and then die off in several weeks. 

Although entomologist C. L. Marlatt published an account in 1907 in which he argued for the existence of 30 broods, over the years a number have been consolidated and only 15 are recognized today as being distinct. Brood XIV is among the 12 different broods with 17-year cycles.

Its last appearance was in the spring and early summer of 2008, and will emerge again in 2025 and 2042.

The 4-centimeter long black insects do not sting or bite. Once they emerge, they spend their short two-week lives climbing trees, shedding their crunchy skins and reproducing. They can number up to a million per 2.4 acres.

2008 Emergence

In 2008 in Massachusetts, Brood XIV severely damaged trees in Mashpee and Falmouth. The damage was highly localized, due to the lack of built-up areas in those towns; trees as close as five miles away were not damaged.

That same year in North Carolina, the hatching caused major damage to many residential trees and small-scale non-industrial orchards, especially around Asheville. Major orchards in the region remained unharmed.

See also
Magicicada

References

Cicadas